Victor S. Drury (1825–1918) was a labor leader and libertarian socialist.  He was a co-author of The Pittsburgh Manifesto to the Workingmen of America.

External links
 Victor S. Drury archive at RevoltLib.com
 Victor Drury archive at TheAnarchistLibrary.org

References 

French anarchists
1825 births
1918 deaths
French political people